Business New Zealand Inc. (operating as BusinessNZ) is New Zealand's largest business-advocacy body. It is headquartered in Wellington. Kirk Hope has served as the chief executive since 2016.

History 

The history of BusinessNZ dates back more than 100 years. In 1902 several regional employers' associations came together to form the New Zealand Employers Federation, in order to present a unified employer voice in collective bargaining and labour disputes arbitrated by the Arbitration Court. 

In 1905 the constitution of the Employers Federation of New Zealand was formally adopted. By 1908 the Federation represented around 6,000 members.

In 1951 the Employers Federation became an incorporated society and by 1971 represented around 10,000 members.

In 2001 the New Zealand Employers Federation merged with the New Zealand Manufacturers Federation to form Business New Zealand (BusinessNZ), advancing the scope of the new organisation to cover greater numbers and types of businesses.

 BusinessNZ comprises regional organisations EMA, Business Central, Canterbury Employers' Chamber of Commerce and Business South, and advocacy entities ExportNZ, ManufacturingNZ, Major Companies Group, Gold Group, Sustainable Business Council, BusinessNZ Energy Council, and Buy NZ Made, with direct membership of around 14,000 members and more than 50,000 indirect or affiliated business members through the Affiliated Industries Group.

Advocacy 

BusinessNZ advocacy focuses on several issues, including competition, free trade, sustainability, industry self-regulation, among others.

Structure

Governing body
BusinessNZ is governed by an elected council, with members drawn from the four regional associations.

Divisions
BusinessNZ has several divisions, including
 ExportNZ
 ManufacturingNZ
 Major Companies Group
 Gold Group
 Sustainable Business Council
 BusinessNZ Energy Council
 Affiliated Industries Group
 Buy NZ Made

All divisions of BusinessNZ and the four regional business associations EMA, Business Central, Canterbury Employers' Chamber of Commerce, and Business South comprise the BusinessNZ Network.

References

External links 
 BusinessNZ
 ExportNZ
 ManufacturingNZ
 Major Companies Group
 Gold Group
 Sustainable Business Council
 BusinessNZ Energy Council
 Buy New Zealand Made
 Affiliated Industries Group
 Employers and Manufacturers Association (EMA)
 Business Central
 Canterbury Employers' Chamber of Commerce
 Business South

Business organisations based in New Zealand
Conservatism in New Zealand